This list of Florida State University people includes notable graduates, non-graduate former students, and current students of Florida State University (FSU). Florida State alumni are generally known as Seminoles. Florida State University is a public space-grant and sea-grant research university in Tallahassee, Florida. Since its founding in 1851, Florida State has graduated 170 classes of students and today has approximately 400,000 alumni.

Academia and research

Educators

Academic administrators

Professors and researchers

Science, space, technology, and math

Astronauts

Meteorology

Rhodes Scholars

Architecture, engineering and building industry

Arts and humanities

Business and finance

Entertainment

Film

Actors

Government, law, and public policy

United States Congress

Governors

State Senators

State Representatives

Mayors

Law

Judges

Journalism and media

Anchors and correspondents

Literature, writing, and translation

Pulitzer Prize winners 
The Pulitzer Prize is an American award regarded as the highest national honor in print journalism, literary achievements, and musical compositions.

Military

Music

Pageantry

Social Reform

Sports

Baseball

Basketball

Football

Other

Notable faculty and staff
Jump to :Category:Florida State University faculty

Florida State University presidents

Faculty winners of major honors

Other notable faculty

See also 
 :Category:Florida State University alumni
 :List of Florida State University faculty
 List of Florida State University athletes

References

External links 
 Florida State Alumni Magazine
 Florida State Alumni Association

Florida State University people